The men's 110 metres hurdles event at the 2008 African Championships in Athletics was held at the Addis Ababa Stadium on May 3.

Results
Wind: -0.3 m/s

References
Results (Archived)

2008 African Championships in Athletics
Sprint hurdles at the African Championships in Athletics